Clepsis neglectana is a moth of the family Tortricidae. It is found in most of Europe, as well as the Ural Mountains, North Africa, Near East and Central Asia.

The wingspan is 12–16 mm. Adults are on wing in April and again from June to July in Europe.

The larvae feed on Fragaria species.

References

External links
 Fauna Europaea
 Swedish Moths

Clepsis
Moths of Europe
Moths described in 1851